Elmore is a small, unincorporated settlement in the northwest corner of Millbrook Township, Peoria County, Illinois.  The Spoon River runs nearby.

It did have one church, a United Methodist Church, but it closed in 2008.  The church building was built in 1865 and 1866 by Presbyterians/Congregationalists then later sold to Methodists.  The building is still being maintained by a benevolent organization.

Elmore was settled in the 1830s.  It was originally named Rochester, but this was changed due to a municipality in Illinois already named Rochester.  Many local people, even in the 21st century, still refer to Elmore as Rochester.  It was recently described in a book about the Underground Railroad by Owen Muelder.  It was an important stop on the Underground Railroad.

References

 Underground Railroad
 http://www.undergroundrailroadconductor.com/UGRRinIllinois.htm 

Unincorporated communities in Peoria County, Illinois
Populated places on the Underground Railroad
Unincorporated communities in Illinois